Dirk Jozef Maria Sterckx, born on 25 September 1946 in Herent, is a Belgian politician of the Vlaamse Liberalen en Democraten who served as a Member of the European Parliament from 1999 until 2011, representing Flanders.

In parliament, Stercks was a member of the Bureau of the Alliance of Liberals and Democrats for Europe and served on the Committee on Fisheries and the Committee on Transport and Tourism. He was also a substitute for the Committee on Industry, Research and Energy.

Education
 1969: Master's degree in Germanic languages and literature

Career
 1969: Teacher
 1975: Journalist, BRT television
 1986: Copy editor of the BRT television news
 1994: Copy editor and anchorman on Terzake, television news interpretation programme
 1996: Head of news and anchorman on VRT television news
 1999: Member of the European Parliament
 2001: Member of Lint Municipal Council (January
 2004: VLD Chairman (February - June)
 Member of the Conference of Delegation Chairmen

See also
 2004 European Parliament election in Belgium

External links
 
 
 

1946 births
Living people
Open Vlaamse Liberalen en Democraten MEPs
MEPs for Belgium 1999–2004
MEPs for Belgium 2004–2009
MEPs for Belgium 2009–2014
People from Herent